Reginald Harry Humphreys (20 May 1888 – 1967) was an English footballer who played in Football League for Manchester City as a right back.

Personal life 
Humpheys was born on 20 May 1888 in Whittington, Shropshire. He was married with two children, and worked as a joiner. He served as an Air Mechanic 1st Class in the Royal Air Force during the First World War. He died in 1967.

Career statistics

References

1888 births
1967 deaths
Association football fullbacks
English carpenters
English Football League players
English footballers
Manchester City F.C. players
Oswestry Town F.C. players
Royal Air Force airmen
Royal Air Force personnel of World War I

Wrexham A.F.C. players